Oh My God (stylized in sentence case) is the second Japanese extended play by South Korean girl group (G)I-dle. The album was released by Universal Music Japan on August 26, 2020 after a year since Latata released.  It contains Japanese versions of songs previously released "Oh My God", "Uh-Oh", "Senorita" and "Dumdi Dumdi" as well as one original Japanese track, "Tung-Tung (Empty)" which was composed by member Minnie.

Background and release
Starting June 23, 2020, (G)I-dle individual images with the phrase "(G)I-DLE 2020.06.29 MON 6PM" were posted on their official Japan twitter. However, the purpose of the teaser image was not clarified. On June 29, it was confirmed that (G)I-dle would release their second Japanese extended play title Oh my god.

On July 10, (G)I-dle released jacket photos of their second mini album Oh my god through their website. The photos showed "two sides of front and back", black and red, black and white, which are linked to the concept of "Angels and Devils" of the song. Along with the release of the jacket photos, a special site for "Oh my god" was opened. Pre-orders began on July 14.

Songs 
The title song "Oh my god" is a song that mixes emotions of rejection, confusion, cognition, and dignity, and reminds to believe in dear self through conflict with reality. "Uh-Oh" is an expression that comes out of your mouth when you come across a puzzle, and it's a song that people who were completely uninterested at first seemed to pretend to be good friends later. "Senorita" is a bold and provocative song about what to do when you fell in love at first sight. Like the meaning of the word "Tung-Tung (텅텅, emptiness), it is a emotional song that expresses the feeling of a tired heart which was once full but became empty. Through Minnie's words, "I hope that many people will sympathize with this song because it conveys loneliness." "Dumdi Dumdi" is a song that (G)I-DLE wants to convey "heat", "coolness", "passion", and "heartbeat" that are associated with summer and youth.

Music video
A lyric video of "Oh My God" was released on July 29, 2020.

The music video of the song was released on August 19, 2020, before the release of the EP on August 26, 2020.

Track listing

Charts

Certifications and sales

Release history

References

External links

2020 EPs
Cube Entertainment EPs
(G)I-dle EPs
Japanese-language EPs
Universal Music Japan EPs
Albums produced by Jeon So-yeon
Albums produced by Minnie (singer)